Mahane Yehuda may refer to:

Mahane Yehuda (neighborhood), a historic neighborhood in Jerusalem, Israel
Mahane Yehuda Market, an open-air marketplace in Jerusalem, Israel
 Mahane Yehuda, a part of south Petah Tikva